The 2002 Exeter City Council election took place on 2 May 2002, to elect members of Exeter City Council in England. The election was held concurrently with other local elections in England. One third of the council was up for election and the Labour Party retained control of the council, which it had held since 1995.

Results summary

Ward results

Alphington

Cowick

Duryard

Exwick

Heavitree

Mincinglake

Newtown

Pennsylvania

Pinhoe

Polsloe

Priory

St Davids

Whipton & Barton

References

2002 English local elections
2002
2000s in Exeter